Verosudil (AR-12286) is a drug which acts as a potent and selective inhibitor of the enzyme Rho kinase, and has been investigated for the treatment of glaucoma.

See also 
 Rho kinase inhibitor

References 

Enzyme inhibitors
Isoquinolines
Thiophenes
Amides
Amines